Ciocalapata is a genus of sea sponges belonging to the family Halichondriidae.

Species 

 Ciocalapata amorphosa (Ridley & Dendy, 1886)
 Ciocalapata minuspiculifera , (Carvalho & Menegola, 2013)
 Ciocalapata almae, (Uriz & García-Gómez, 1996)
 Ciocalapata gibbsi, (Wells & Gray, 1960)

References 

Halichondrida
Sponge genera